The Fresno State Bulldogs college football team represent California State University, Fresno in the Mountain West Conference. The Bulldogs competed in the National Collegiate Athletic Association (NCAA) College Division in the years 1921–1968. In 1969, the team moved to National Collegiate Athletic Association (NCAA) Division I.

The program has had 18 different head coaches in its 96 seasons of existence (through 2016), including three who had multiple tenures as coach.

Coaches

References

Fresno State Bulldogs

Fresno State Bulldogs football